Ochthodium is a genus of flowering plants belonging to the family Brassicaceae.

Its native range is Eastern Mediterranean.

Species
Species:
 Ochthodium aegyptiacum (L.) DC.

References

Brassicaceae
Brassicaceae genera